The 2014 Camden Council election took place on 22 May 2014 to elect members of Camden Council in London. This was on the same day as other local elections.

Election result

|}

Ward results

Belsize

Bloomsbury

Camden Town with Primrose Hill

Cantelowes

Fortune Green

Frognal and Fitzjohns

Gospel Oak

Hampstead Town

Haverstock

Highgate

Holborn and Covent Garden

Kentish Town

Kilburn

King's Cross

Regent's Park

St Pancras and Somers Town

Swiss Cottage 

In 2018, Cllr Andrew Marshall resigned from the Conservative Party and defected to the Liberal Democrats.

West Hampstead

References

Camden
2014